The 2019 Asian Judo Championships were the 24th edition of the Asian Judo Championships, and were held in Fujairah, United Arab Emirates from April 20 to April 23, 2019.

Medal summary

Men

Women

Mixed

Medal table

References

External links
 

Asian Judo Championships
Oceanian Judo Championships
Asian Championships
Asian-Pacific Judo Championships
International sports competitions hosted by the United Arab Emirates
Asian-Pacific Judo Championships